Molchanovsky District (Selkup: Малчанвэл аймак) is an administrative and municipal district (raion), one of the sixteen in Tomsk Oblast, Russia. It is located in the eastern central part of the oblast. Its administrative center is the rural locality (a selo) of Molchanovo. Population: 13,446 (2010 Census);  The population of Molchanovo accounts for 42.7% of the district's total population.

References

Notes

Sources

Districts of Tomsk Oblast